Ingrid González (born 13 April 1971) is a former Salvadoran tennis player.

González holds the national records for the El Salvador Fed Cup team in most wins and most ties played for her country.

References

External links 
 
 

1971 births
Living people
Salvadoran female tennis players